This is a list of the National Register of Historic Places listings in Clay County, Texas.

This is intended to be a complete list of properties listed on the National Register of Historic Places in Clay County, Texas. There are two properties listed on the National Register in the county. One property is also a State Antiquities Landmark and includes two Recorded Texas Historic Landmarks.

Current listings

The locations of National Register properties may be seen in a mapping service provided.

|}

See also

National Register of Historic Places listings in Texas
List of bridges on the National Register of Historic Places in Texas
Recorded Texas Historic Landmarks in Clay County

References

External links

Clay County, Texas
Clay County
Buildings and structures in Clay County, Texas